Rhipsalis pacheco-leonis is a species of plant in the family Cactaceae. It is endemic to Brazil.  Its natural habitats are subtropical or tropical moist lowland forests and rocky areas. It is threatened by habitat loss. It needs water and sunlight.

References

pacheco-leonis
Endemic flora of Brazil
Data deficient plants
Taxonomy articles created by Polbot